Mohammed El Yaagoubi Youbi (born 12 September 1977), known as Moha, is a Moroccan retired footballer who played as a left midfielder.

Due to the many years spent in Spain – his entire professional career, which spanned nearly 15 years – he also held a passport from that country. He amassed La Liga totals of 149 games and 11 goals over the course of seven seasons, representing in the competition Osasuna and Espanyol.

Club career
Born in Taourirt, Morocco, Moha moved to Spain in the early 1980s. He started his club career with FC Barcelona, representing however only its C and B-teams. He spent the bulk of his career at CA Osasuna, first playing two matches in the 2000–01 season in La Liga.

After two Segunda División loans, with Levante UD and Elche CF, Moha returned to the Navarrese, going on to become a crucial offensive element although never an undisputed starter. On 11 April 2004 he scored in a 3–0 away win against Real Madrid and, in 2005–06, as Osasuna finished a best-ever fourth, he netted twice in 27 games.

Moha then returned to Catalonia as he joined RCD Espanyol for €400.000 going on to feature sparingly, especially in his second year, although he did contribute with eight matches to the club's runner-up campaign in the UEFA Cup. Released in June 2008, he joined Real Sociedad on a free transfer.

After not being able to help Real Sociedad return to the top flight, Moha moved to another side in that tier, Girona FC.

International career
Moha made his international debut for Morocco on 12 March 2003 against Senegal, in a friendly, being part of the squad at the 2004 African Cup of Nations for a final runner-up position (all games played, although none complete).

Honours

Club
Espanyol
UEFA Cup: Runner-up 2006–07

Country
Morocco
Africa Cup of Nations: Runner-up 2004

References

External links
 
 
 
 

1977 births
Living people
People from Taourirt, Morocco
Spanish sportspeople of Moroccan descent
Spanish people of Moroccan-Berber descent
Berber Moroccans
Moroccan footballers
Spanish footballers
Association football midfielders
La Liga players
Segunda División players
Segunda División B players
Tercera División players
FC Santboià players
FC Barcelona C players
FC Barcelona Atlètic players
CA Osasuna players
Levante UD footballers
Elche CF players
RCD Espanyol footballers
Real Sociedad footballers
Girona FC players
CE Sabadell FC footballers
Morocco international footballers
2004 African Cup of Nations players
Moroccan expatriate footballers
Expatriate footballers in Spain
Moroccan expatriate sportspeople in Spain
Footballers from Catalonia